Calendar Girls (previously titled The Girls) is a musical with music by Gary Barlow, lyrics by Gary Barlow and Tim Firth, and a book by Tim Firth. The musical is based on the 2003 film Calendar Girls, which is in turn based on a true story.

Synopsis 
Annie's husband John dies from leukaemia at an early age. Her close friend, Chris, wants to purchase a comfortable sofa for the visitors' lounge in the hospital where John was treated. She hits upon the idea of printing a calendar featuring some of the members of the Knapely branch of the Women's Institute, discreetly posing nude while engaged in traditional WI activities, such as baking and knitting, in order to raise funds. Her proposal is initially met with great scepticism, but she eventually convinces ten women to participate in the project with her. They enlist one of the hospital workers, an amateur photographer named Lawrence, to help them with the calendar.

Background
The musical is based on the 2003 film Calendar Girls. The film itself was produced on a budget of $10 million, earning over $96 million in global box office receipts. A stage play adaptation was launched in 2008 at the Chichester Festival Theatre, before embarking on a national tour and transferring to the West End's Noël Coward Theatre in 2009.

Production history

Leeds and Salford (2015–2016)
The musical originally premiered as The Girls at the Grand Theatre, Leeds running from 14 November to 12 December 2015, followed by a transfer to The Lowry, Salford from 13 to 30 January 2016. The production was directed by Roger Haines and Tim Firth.

West End (2017)
Following the Leeds and Salford tryouts, the production transferred to London's West End at the Phoenix Theatre with an official opening night on 21 February 2017, with previews from 28 January 2017. The production was directed by Tim Firth, with sets and costume design by Rob Jones, lighting by Tim Lutkin, musical staging by Lizzi Gee, comedy staging by Jos Houben, sound design by Terry Jardine and Nick Lidster for Autograph Design, and projection design by Alex Uragllo, The production closed on 15 July 2017.

UK and Ireland tour (2018–2019)

In 2017 it was announced that the musical would embark a UK tour under a new title; Calendar Girls The Musical. The tour opened on 16 August 2018 with a return visit to the Grand Theatre, Leeds and toured for 15 months until 23 November 2019, ending at the Chichester Festival Theatre (the originating theatre of the original play adaptation).

Musical numbers

Act 1
 "Yorkshire"
 "Mrs Conventional"
 "Scarborough"
 "Who Wants a Silent Night?"
 "Very, Slightly, Almost"
 "Spring Fete'
 "The Flowers of Yorkshire"
 "Time Passing"
 "Sunflower"

Act 2
 "Dare"
 "Protect Me Less"
 "Girls (Reprise)"
 "So I've had a Little Work Done"
 "What Age Expects"
 "Killimanjaro"
 "Crazy Paving"
 "Dare (Reprise)"
 "My Russian Friend and I"
 "For One Night Only"
 "Sunflower of Yorkshire"

The London Cast Recording was released on 9 March 2018.

Cast and characters

References

External links
 

2015 musicals
Musicals based on films
Musicals inspired by real-life events
Plays set in the United Kingdom
West End musicals